Sheikh Ali Bin Khalid Al-Thani (born September 1, 1982) is a Qatari equestrian. He competed at the 2016 Summer Olympics in the individual jumping event, in which he placed sixth, and in the team jumping event, in which Qatar's team placed ninth. He was the flag bearer for Qatar at the Parade of Nations.

References

1982 births
Living people
Qatari male equestrians
Equestrians at the 2016 Summer Olympics
Olympic equestrians of Qatar
Equestrians at the 2006 Asian Games
Equestrians at the 2010 Asian Games
Equestrians at the 2014 Asian Games
Equestrians at the 2018 Asian Games
Asian Games gold medalists for Qatar
Asian Games silver medalists for Qatar
Asian Games bronze medalists for Qatar
Asian Games medalists in equestrian
Medalists at the 2014 Asian Games
Medalists at the 2018 Asian Games